Massachusetts House of Representatives' 23rd Middlesex district in the United States is one of 160 legislative districts included in the lower house of the Massachusetts General Court. It covers part of Middlesex County. Democrat Sean Garballey of Arlington has represented the district since 2009.

Locales represented
The district includes the following localities:
 part of Arlington
 part of Medford

The current district geographic boundary overlaps with those of the Massachusetts Senate's 2nd Middlesex and 4th Middlesex districts.

Former locales
The district previously covered:
 Melrose, circa 1872 
 South Reading, circa 1872 
 Stoneham, circa 1872

Representatives
 Horatio G.F. Corliss, circa 1858 
 Sullivan Tay, circa 1858-1859 
 William G. Wise, circa 1858 
 Marcus A. Thomas, circa 1859 
 Jno. C. Woodward, circa 1859 
 Peter J. Brady, circa 1888 
 Charles M. Austin, circa 1920 
 William Fleming, circa 1920 
 Harvey E. Frost, circa 1920 
 Edward L. Kerr, circa 1951 
 William Walter Kirlin, circa 1951 
 George Keverian, circa 1975 
 Jim Marzilli
 Sean Garballey, 2009-current

See also
 List of Massachusetts House of Representatives elections
 List of Massachusetts General Courts
 List of former districts of the Massachusetts House of Representatives
 Other Middlesex County districts of the Massachusetts House of Representatives: 1st, 2nd, 3rd, 4th, 5th, 6th, 7th, 8th, 9th, 10th, 11th, 12th, 13th, 14th, 15th, 16th, 17th, 18th, 19th, 20th, 21st, 22nd, 24th, 25th, 26th, 27th, 28th, 29th, 30th, 31st, 32nd, 33rd, 34th, 35th, 36th, 37th

Images
Portraits of legislators

References

External links
 Ballotpedia
  (State House district information based on U.S. Census Bureau's American Community Survey).
 League of Women Voters of Arlington, Massachusetts

House
Government of Middlesex County, Massachusetts